Muhammad Shukor bin Adan (born 24 September 1979 in Malacca) is a former Malaysian professional footballer. He played for many teams in Malaysian Football League such as Selangor FC and also Negeri Sembilan FA. He plays mainly as a defensive midfielder but can also play as a centre back if he successfully arches.

Shukor is the former captain of the Selangor team. He is a former member and former captain of the Malaysian national team of 2014 AFF Suzuki Cup campaign. He has been described as one of the top Malaysia midfielders in history.

Club career
Shukor started his football career with Malacca President Cup team in 1995. Three years later, he joined Negeri Sembilan President Cup team. He got his big break when Negeri Sembilan called him up for the first team in 2000. Two years later, he signed a contract with Selangor and remained there until 2008. His contract was terminated by Selangor after spending six years with the team.

After his contract with Selangor expired, he became a free agent for four months. In November 2008, he agreed to join a team based in Brunei DPMM Brunei for 2009 Malaysia League season, after finishing his duty with the national team. However, he made a decision to return to his former team, Negeri Sembilan. Shukor helped them to win the Malaysia Cup 2009 and was named as the Man of the Match.

After his contract with Negeri Sembilan expired, he then joined the army team, ATM for the 2013 league season.

After spending a season with ATM, he signed a contract with Felda United and was appointed as the captain. He helped them secure promotion to the Malaysian Super League in 2015. At Felda, he was converted to a central defender from his usual position as central midfielder.

In the 2019 season, Shukor Adan transferred to Melaka United alongside many other ex-captains of other clubs like Razman Roslan from Selangor FA and Safiq Rahim from Johor Darul Ta'zim F.C.

In 2021, Shukor announced his retirement from football in 2021 Malaysia Cup Final. He hung up his boots happily after winning the Malaysia Cup 2021 against Johor Darul Ta'zim

International career
Shukor made his international debut in the World Cup qualifier with the senior national team in 2001 under Allan Harris. In 2002, Shukor was call up for an international friendly match against five times World Cup winners Brazil. He was came as substitute to replaced Tengku Hazman against Brazilian stars such as Ronaldo and Barca's Ronaldinho. After that, he played for the national team in 2002 Tiger Cup, 2004 Tiger Cup, 2005 Islamic Solidarity Games, 2007 AFF Championship, 2007 AFC Asian Cup, 2008 AFF Suzuki Cup and 2014 AFF Suzuki Cup.

He played for the Malaysia Selection that lost 6–0 to Manchester United during the English champions tour of Asia. He also represented the Malaysia Selection as a captain against Chelsea at Shah Alam Stadium on 29 July 2008. The Malaysia Selection eventually lost 0–2. However, Chelsea's coach Luiz Felipe Scolari praised Malaysia XI for giving a good fight against his team.

He was unexpectedly recalled to Malaysia national team, after a long period of absence, for a match against Indonesia on 14 September 2014 by national coach Dollah Salleh. He started the match, which ends in a 2–0 loss to Malaysia.

Dollah Salleh called him up again for 2014 AFF Suzuki Cup tournament. He replaced Safiq Rahim as national team captain just before the tournament. He retired after the tournament.

Career statistics

Club

International

International goals

Honours

Club
Selangor
 Malaysian Charity Shield: 2002
 Malaysian Premier League: 2005
 Malaysia Cup: 2002, 2005
 Malaysian FA Cup: 2005

Negeri Sembilan
 Malaysia Cup: 2009, 2011
 Malaysia FA Cup: 2010

ATM
 Piala Sumbangsih: 2013

Felda United
 Malaysian Premier League: 2018, runner-up: 2014
 Malaysia FA Cup: runner-up: 2014
 Malaysian Super League: 2016 runner-up, 2017 3rd place

Kuala Lumpur
 Malaysia Cup: 2021

International 
 Southeast Asian Games:  Silver 2001
 Pestabola Merdeka: 2007
 AFF Suzuki Cup runner-up: 2014

Individual
 FAM Football Awards – Most Valuable Players: 2007 – Selangor FA

Records
 The oldest goalscorer in Malaysia Super League (41 years old)
The longest gap between first and last Malaysia Cup finals appearances: (2000–2021) 21 years

References

External links
 
 Muhammad Shukor Adan's Profile at F.A.M. website
 Muhammad Shukor Adan's Profile at Selangorfc.com website
 

1979 births
Living people
Malaysian people of Malay descent
Malaysian footballers
Malaysia international footballers
2007 AFC Asian Cup players
Negeri Sembilan FA players
ATM FA players
Selangor FA players
Felda United F.C. players
Melaka United F.C. players
Kuala Lumpur City F.C. players
People from Malacca
Malaysia Super League players
Association football defenders
Association football midfielders
Footballers at the 2002 Asian Games
Asian Games competitors for Malaysia
Southeast Asian Games silver medalists for Malaysia
Southeast Asian Games medalists in football